Maize is a video game by Finish Line Games in Toronto. It was released on December 1, 2016.

Gameplay

GameSpot says the game is an "absurdist" game based on Monty Python and X-Files humor. It tells the story of sentient corn created by government scientists who misinterpreted a memo.

During gameplay, players encounter talking objects and solve puzzles. It takes place at an abandoned farm, nearby an active underground research facility. The game also requires you to collect pieces of information.

Release

Toronto-based studio Finish Line Games worked on it, after they had made Cel Damage HD. A trailer came out in May 2016. It later came out for PC in the fall. It was released on December 1, 2016.

Reception

Metacritic gave it a compiled score of 65/100 from 17 critics.

City Weekly liked the game and found it entertaining, but disliked the frame rate stalling.

References

Adventure games
Point-and-click adventure games
Video games developed in Canada
Windows games
Windows-only games
2016 video games